Football Manager 2010 (abbreviated to FM10) is a football manager simulation video game and the sixth instalment in the Football Manager series developed by Sports Interactive and published by Sega. It was released on Microsoft Windows, Mac OS X and PlayStation Portable on 30 October 2009. It is also available for digital download on Steam and iOS. A demo for FM10 was released on 14 October 2009.

This is the first release in the series to be sold under the Football Manager name throughout the world. Previous North American versions were sold as Worldwide Soccer Manager.

Gameplay
FM10 features similar gameplay to that of the Football Manager series. Gameplay consists of taking charge of a professional association football team, as the team manager. Players can sign football players to contracts, manage finances for the club, and give team talks to players. FM10 is a simulation of real world management, with the player being judged on various factors by the club's AI owners and board.

FM10 expanded on the 3D match engine first introduced in Football Manager 2009, with more animations, stadiums, and even pitch degradation. The database editor has also received an upgrade, the stand-out feature of which is the option to add new divisions to existing leagues or to add entirely new leagues to a game database. Users can then, for example, make the English league system fully playable right down to its lowest tier (up to level 20), making it the first football management game capable of doing so, or they could make a league for a nation whose league is not normally playable, or even make their own entirely new league, such as a "super league".

The first patch, 10.1, was released on 30 October 2009. Version 10.1.1 was released on 2 December 2009. The next major patch, 10.2, was released on 17 December 2009. The last patch – 10.3, which includes mid-season transfer update – was released on 1 March 2010.

Reception

Football Manager 2010 was positively received, achieving a Metacritic average of 87/100.

IGN concluded that: "FM2010 isn't an evolutionary step in the series. Instead it's merely an incredibly well produced update."

In its Christmas 2009 edition, Edge commented that: "Despite being all about the numbers, FM2010 rises above them to be unexpectedly cruel, kind, and even visceral at times."

See also
Championship Manager 2010

Notes

References

2009 video games
2010
Games for Windows certified games
IOS games
Classic Mac OS games
MacOS games
PlayStation Portable games
Sega video games
Video games developed in the United Kingdom
Windows games